Hamza Haq (born October 27, 1990)  is a Canadian actor, best known for his leading role in the television series Transplant.

Early life
Hamza Haq was born to Pakistani parents in Jeddah, Saudi Arabia, before immigrating to Canada when he was nine years old, where he became a Canadian citizen. His father worked for an airline while his mother was an organic chemist. He learned English from a school in the Filipino embassy in Saudi Arabia before switching to an American school. He later attended Bell High School in Ottawa, Ontario. Haq graduated from Carleton University with a Bachelor of Arts in film studies with a minor in Law.

Career
Haq started his career with roles on various television series, before taking on roles in feature films. As an actor, his work has included the television series Quantico and limited series The Indian Detective. He was also the host for the children's television series Look Kool.

At the 6th Canadian Screen Awards in 2018, he received a nomination for Best Performance in a Guest Role in a Drama Series for an appearance on This Life, and in 2019 he received the Star award from the Mosaic International South Asian Film Festival.

In 2020, he assumed the lead role in the television series Transplant, and had a supporting role in Philippe Falardeau's film My Salinger Year.

In his year-end review of television in 2020, critic John Doyle of The Globe and Mail named Haq as having given one of the year's best performances in Canadian television. The industry trade magazine Playback also named Haq as Canadian television's breakout star of 2020.

Haq won the award for Best Actor in a Drama Series for Transplant at the 9th Canadian Screen Awards in 2021 and at the 10th Canadian Screen Awards in 2022.

Filmography

Film

Television

References

External links

Living people
21st-century Canadian male actors
Carleton University alumni
Saudi Arabian male television actors
Saudi Arabian male film actors
Canadian male film actors
Canadian male television actors
Canadian male voice actors
People from Jeddah
Saudi Arabian emigrants to Canada
Canadian male actors of Pakistani descent
1990 births
Best Actor in a Drama Series Canadian Screen Award winners